St. Ambrose College of Education is a teacher education college in Dormaa Akwamu (Dormaa East District, Brong Ahafo Region, Ghana). The college is located in Ashanti / Brong Ahafo zone. It is one of the about 40 public colleges of education in Ghana. The college participated in the DFID-funded T-TEL programme.  It was established in November 2009 by the Catholic Diocese of Sunyani and officially commissioned in January 2011. In the 2016–2017 academic year it became a Public College of Education. It is affiliated to the University of Cape Coast.
The idea of establishing a College of Education at Dormaa Akwamu was muted by the Dormaa Akwamuhene, Barima Oppong Kyeremeh Sikafo (aka Nana Kojo Danso-Mensah), a former Deputy Registrar in charge of Administration of the University of Cape Coast. He pursued this dream by imploring the Catholic Archdiocese of Sunyani to make it a reality which culminated in the establishment of St. Ambrose College of Education at Dormaa Akwamu.

References 

Christian universities and colleges in Ghana
Colleges of Education in Ghana
Brong-Ahafo Region